Hamlet Vladimiri Mkhitaryan (born 24 November 1973 in Yerevan, Armenia) is a retired Armenian football player. He also played for the Armenia national team.

Club career
In 2005, Mkhitaryan was on the verge of signing with Scottish club Hearts, but the contract has not been signed between the two parties due to work permit complications. In October 2006, he joined the Tehran club Pas in the Iran Pro League. In 2007, after Pas was officially dissolved, he signed with another Tehran club, Rah Ahan. After playing for 2 seasons, he joined Armenian Premier League club Banants Yerevan and returned home. He later went back to Iran, where he signed a contract with Damash Gilan. For one season he played on his third Tehran club, Parse Tehran. Mkhitaryan currently plays for Gahar Zagros.

International career
Mkhitaryan debuted for Armenia national team in away friendly match against United States on 15 May 1994. Hamlet participated in 56 international matches and scored 2 goals. He left the national team in 2008.

Honours
 Lebanese Premier League Team of the Season: 2001–02

References

External links
 
 
 
 

1973 births
Living people
Footballers from Yerevan
Soviet footballers
Armenian footballers
Association football midfielders
Armenia international footballers
Armenian expatriate footballers
Expatriate footballers in Israel
Expatriate footballers in Lebanon
Expatriate footballers in Kazakhstan
Expatriate footballers in Belarus
Expatriate footballers in Iran
Armenian expatriate sportspeople in Kazakhstan
Armenian expatriate sportspeople in Iran
Armenian expatriate sportspeople in Israel
Armenian Premier League players
Liga Leumit players
Israeli Premier League players
FC Ararat Yerevan players
FC Pyunik players
Maccabi Herzliya F.C. players
Homenmen Beirut players
Tadamon Sour SC players
FC Vostok players
FC Partizan Minsk players
Pas players
Rah Ahan players
FC Urartu players
Damash Gilan players
Gahar Zagros players
Armenian football managers
Armenian expatriate sportspeople in Lebanon
Lebanese Premier League players
Soviet Armenians
Soviet Top League players